The Criminal Attempts Act 1981 (c 47) is an Act of the Parliament of the United Kingdom. It applies to England and Wales and creates criminal offences pertaining to attempting to commit crimes. It abolished the common law offence of attempt.

Provisions

Attempting to commit an offence
Section 1(1) of the Act creates the offence of attempt:

Section 1 applies to any indictable offence triable in England and Wales, except conspiracy, aiding and abetting, and offences under sections 4 and 5 of the Criminal Law Act 1967 (which deal with assisting offenders and concealing information about crimes).

Section 1(2) reads:

Section 1(3) states that a person is to be judged according to what the defendant thought the facts of the case were at the time of the attempt, rather than what the facts really were, in the event that the defendant was mistaken about what was happening.

Section 2 states that rules regarding time limits for prosecuting, powers of arrest and search, and so on, are the same for offences of attempting to commit an offence as they are for the offence attempted.

Section 3 provides that where another Act creates an offence of attempting to commit an offence under that Act, similar rules apply to that offence as the rules in section 1 (unless the other Act specifically says otherwise).

Section 4 generally sets the penalties for attempting to commit an offence as the same as the offence attempted. The only exception today is murder, which carries a mandatory sentence of life imprisonment, whereas section 4 makes the sentence for attempted murder discretionary (up to a maximum of life imprisonment).

Historically, offences under the Sexual Offences Act 1956 (repealed in 2004) were exempt from section 4, and attempts to commit sexual offences sometimes carried lower sentences than the completed offence. For example, rape was punishable with life imprisonment, but attempted rape carried a maximum of seven years, until the 1956 Act was amended by the Sexual Offences Act 1985.

Other offences
The Act abolished the offence of "loitering with intent" under the Vagrancy Act 1824.

Section 9 creates a summary offence called "vehicle interference." This is committed by interfering with a motor vehicle or trailer, or anything in the vehicle or trailer, with intent to steal it or anything in it. It carries a maximum sentence of three months.

Case law 
 Anderton v Ryan [1985] AC 560
 R v Shivpuri [1987] AC 1

References

External links

Full text of the Act as amended and currently in force

United Kingdom Acts of Parliament 1981
English criminal law
Law enforcement in England and Wales
Attempt